Randolph is a masculine given name in the English language. The name is derived from the Old Norse Rannúlfr which is composed of two elements: "shield" or "rim" + "wolf". Cognates of the name include Randolf, Randulph, and Wandolfin. A pet form of Randolf is Randy.

People with the given name include:
 Lord Randolph Churchill (1849–1895), British statesman
 William Randolph Hearst (1863-1951), American businessman, newspaper publisher, and politician known for developing the nation's largest newspaper chain and media company, Hearst Communications.
 Randolph Churchill (1911–1968), British politician
 Randolph Mantooth (b. 1945), American actor
 Randolph Jewell Francis Mendis, Sri Lankan Sinhala educationist, first indigenous Commander of the Ceylon Defence Force
 Randolph Roberts (b. 1947), American actor
 Randolph Severn Parker III (Trey Parker), one of the creators of the animated series South Park
 Randolph Scott (1898–1987), American actor

See also 
 Randolph (disambiguation)
 Randolph (surname)
 Randall (given name)
 Randulf
 Rudolph (name)

English-language masculine given names
English masculine given names